Harry Howarth JP (3 August 1916 – 8 August 1969) was a British railway clerk and politician.

Howarth was a native of Crompton in Lancashire, England, and was educated at Crompton House School in the locality. He worked on the railways, joining the Transport Salaried Staffs Association, but joined the Royal Air Force on the outbreak of the Second World War; after demobilization he returned to his old job.

In 1950 Howarth joined the Labour Party. He served on the National Executive Committee of his Union from 1954 to 1960, and was elected to Wembley Borough Council from 1953 to 1956 and 1957 to 1960. He was a justice of the peace for the Gore Division of Middlesex from 1957. Howarth served as a magistrate in both the adult and juvenile courts.

At the 1964 general election, Howarth was narrowly elected as Labour MP for Wellingborough in Northamptonshire. In Parliament he was interested in transport, local government and Home Office matters.  He was re-elected in the 1966 election with his majority increased to 2,233, but died in post at Rickmansworth in August 1969.

References

External links 
 

1916 births
1969 deaths
British trade unionists
Councillors in Greater London
Labour Party (UK) MPs for English constituencies
People from Shaw and Crompton
Royal Air Force personnel of World War II
Transport Salaried Staffs' Association-sponsored MPs
UK MPs 1964–1966
UK MPs 1966–1970